Krisztina Holly, known by her colleagues as 'Z'  is a Hungarian American innovator, entrepreneur, and adventurer.

Holly is best known as the creator of the first TEDx, the founding executive director of the Deshpande Center for Technological Innovation at the Massachusetts Institute of Technology and the Vice Provost for Innovation and founding executive director of the Stevens Center for Innovation at the University of Southern California. She was founder or key team member of various technology startups including Stylus Innovation, Direct Hit Technologies, and Jeeves Solutions and was a prominent mountain bike advocate in New England for a decade. She is host of The Art of Manufacturing podcast and served as the Founder and Chief Instigator of MAKE IT IN LA, which was launched from her term as Entrepreneur-in-Residence for LA Mayor Garcetti.

She is a founding donor and board member of the River LA, serves on the board of TTI/Vanguard, and has been an advisor to nearly two dozen other companies and organizations, including the Obama Administration as an inaugural member of the National Advisory Council on Innovation and Entrepreneurship and a global agenda council member of the World Economic Forum, advising in the areas of entrepreneurship and manufacturing. She is married and resides in Los Angeles.

Early life
Holly was born to Hungarian parents and has written about being greatly influenced by their stories of escaping their home country in 1956 and being refugees in America. She spent her teen years SCUBA diving off the coast of Southern California and playing bass guitar, and from a young age she thought she would be an entrepreneur.
She attended the Massachusetts Institute of Technology and received bachelor's and master's degrees in mechanical engineering. She, Michael Cassidy and John Barrus won the MIT business plan competition in 1991 with Stylus Innovation, which was acquired by Artisoft in 1996 for $12.8M.

Career

Holly created TEDxUSC, the first-ever TEDx event, in 2009, which has inspired more than 30,000 similar events globally, and as of October 2017 the TEDx archive surpassed 100,000 talks. In her role as curator and host for TEDxUSC over four years, she discovered and coached more than 60 presenters whose videos have garnered 12 million views online. From 2006-2012 she was the vice provost for innovation at USC and founding executive director the USC Stevens Center for Innovation. From 2002-2006 she was the founding executive director of the MIT Deshpande Center. While at MIT and USC, she helped expand the innovation ecosystems in Boston and LA and the centers helped spin out 39 startups based on university research.

Early on Holly was co-founder of computer telephony pioneer Stylus Innovation (acquired by Artisoft) and subsequently joined other tech and media startups including Direct Hit Technologies (acquired by Ask Jeeves) and Jeeves Solutions. Between startups Holly spent nearly three years in documentary production.

Holly started her career as an undergraduate researcher at the MIT Media Lab, working on the team that created the world's first full-color computer generated reflection hologram. Later, she developed a robotic weld-seam-tracking program for the space shuttle main engine and built a head-eye robot for the MIT AI Lab.

Holly was named Champion of Free Enterprise by Forbes in 2009 and has been recognized by Rolling Stone, WIRED, The New York Times and Entrepreneur Magazines for her ability to build scalable business models and scout and cultivate undiscovered innovators. She  has been a contributor to Forbes, The Economist, Businessweek, Huffington Post, CNN.com, NASA ASK, strategy+business, World Economic Forum, Science Progress, Innovation Management, and Mountain Bike Magazine. She has also served as a board member or advisor for numerous organizations.

References

External links
 Official bio
 
 The Art of Manufacturing podcast page

Living people
MIT Media Lab people
Technology company founders
American people of Hungarian descent
American women company founders
American company founders
Hungarian mechanical engineers
American women engineers
Hungarian company founders
American mechanical engineers
MIT School of Engineering alumni
21st-century women engineers
Year of birth missing (living people)
21st-century American women